The Metropolitan Borough of Holborn was a metropolitan borough in the County of London between 1900 and 1965, when it was amalgamated with the Metropolitan Borough of St Pancras and the Metropolitan Borough of Hampstead to form the London Borough of Camden.

Formation and boundaries
The borough was formed from seven civil parishes and extra-parochial places in 1900: Furnival's Inn (part), Gray's Inn, Liberty of Saffron Hill, Lincoln's Inn, St Andrew Holborn Above the Bars with St George the Martyr, St Giles in the Fields and St George Bloomsbury and Staple Inn. In 1930 these seven were combined into a single civil parish called Holborn, which was conterminous with the metropolitan borough.

Previous to the borough's formation it had been administered by two separate local bodies: Holborn District Board of Works and St Giles District Board of Works. The Inns of Court and Inns of Chancery had not been under the control of any local authority prior to 1900.

Coat of arms
St Giles, St George and St Andrew were depicted on the borough seal. The several constituent parishes were illustrated in the arms granted to Holborn in 1906, while the supporters, the Lion and the Griffin are from the arms of Lincoln's Inn and Gray's Inn (Inns of Court).

Charges from these arms were used, together with charges from the coats of arms of Hampstead and of St. Pancras, when the new coat of arms of the London Borough of Camden was designed in 1965.

Visible legacy
Several of the street name signs in the British Museum/Senate House area still bear the "Borough of Holborn" area designation. Holborn Town Hall, built in 1894, still exists, on High Holborn, and still has the coat of arms in the façade.

Population and area
Therefore, it was even smaller than the City of London. It also had the smallest population of any of the boroughs throughout its existence. The populations recorded in National Censuses were:

Constituent parishes 1801–1899

Metropolitan Borough 1900-1961

Politics

The borough was divided into nine wards for elections: Central St Giles, Lincoln's Inn, North Bloomsbury, North St Andrew, North St Giles, Saffron Hill, South Bloomsbury, South East St Andrew and St George the Martyr.

Borough council

Parliament constituency
For elections to Parliament, the borough was represented by one constituency:
Holborn
In 1950 the borough's representation was reduced to half a seat, when it was merged with part of St Pancras:
Holborn and St Pancras South

Gallery

See also
London Government Act 1899
Metropolis Management Act 1855
Bourne Estate

References

Further reading
 

Metropolitan boroughs of the County of London
History of the London Borough of Camden
20th century in London
1900 establishments in the United Kingdom
1965 disestablishments in the United Kingdom
Districts abolished by the London Government Act 1963
Metropolitan Borough of